Charles (Carl Michael) Bernhoeft (22 July 1859 – 1933) was a photographer in Luxembourg, where he took portraits of the Grand Ducal court as well as numerous landscapes which he turned into postcards.

Early life and family

Born in Luxembourg City on 22 July 1859, Bernhoeft was the son of army officer Carl Johann Adolph Bernhoeft and Marguerite Specht, the daughter of a merchant. He was the only son but had six sisters. In 1889, after studying photography and lithography, Bernhoeft married Marie-Louise Bernardy, a schoolteacher's daughter. They had two sons.

Career

Apart from his photographic work, few details remain about Bernhoeft's life. There are however still a number of his luxurious photo albums, illustrated magazines and above all several series of postcards, one of which contains 1,600 different images. An advertisement indicates that some 20 people were employed by his firm, Editions photographiques Bernhoeft.

In 1895, together with the journalist Jean-Nicolas Moes, Bernhoeft launched Luxembourg's first illustrated weekly magazine, Das Luxemburger Land in Wort und Bild, which, however, could only publish nine issues.

Much of his commercial success resulted from his appointment as court photographer in 1891. His first studio in Luxembourg was at 1, rue du Génie (now avenue Monterey) but by 1900 he was in a position to construct impressive new three-storey premises for what he called Atelier Bernhoeft at the corner of rue de l'Arsenal (Grand-Rue) and boulevard Royal. For his portraits, he used the widely available carte de visite and cabinet card formats.

Albums such as Cöln und der Rhein (1895–1896), Bilder aus der Pfalz (1895), Nederland in Beeld (1896) and Eifel-Album (1896) show that he did not travel far outside the borders of Luxembourg, although he did reproduce exotic pictures from exhibitions such as the Antwerp International Exposition in 1894.

Bernhoeft's work did much to encourage tourism, which was just beginning to develop at the time. He not only published photographic albums documenting Luxembourg and its surroundings but also illustrated maps of the city and the Moselle Valley. His postcards were also popular with tourists.

Flash invention

Bernhoeft was also successful as an inventor, developing systems providing indirect artificial lighting to facilitate portrait photography. He adapted the approach to magnesium flash photography, which proved particularly successful for photographing children, unable to keep still for very long. He patented the device as Bernhoeft's Blitzlichtapparat Sanssouci and succeeded in selling some 300 units.

References

Luxembourgian photographers
1859 births
1933 deaths
People from Luxembourg City